Sybil Ann Robson Orr (born 1962) is an American film producer. She is a niece of Walmart founder Sam Walton and Helen Walton, and the founder of Robson Orr Entertainment.

Early life and career
Sybil Robson Orr was born in 1962 in Tulsa, Oklahoma, the daughter of Alma (née White) and Nick Robson. Her mother was a homemaker and her father was the son of a prosperous Oklahoma rancher.  Together with his brother Frank Robson and brothers-in-law Sam and Bud Walton, he expanded Walmart as a franchise operation across the country.

Robson Orr graduated from Tulsa's Memorial High School, and went on to earn a BA from Southern Methodist University. She then began her career as a news reporter and television anchor at news 2, Winston Salem NC, the United States. She briefly cohosted a syndicated tabloid television show before transitioning to ABC News in Paris. She then launched a nationally syndicated consumer program for Paramount Pictures. Following this, she partnered with producer Harvey Bernhard to create "Robson/Bernhard Entertainment" for Universal Pictures. Before and during the partnership, she wrote and produced documentaries based in Sub-Saharan Africa, focusing on socio-economic issues.

In 1993, she founded her own production company, Robson Entertainment (now Robson Orr Entertainment), which has offices in Beverly Hills and London. She produced the 1995 family dramedy film Gordy and the 2001 dramedy film Seven and a Match. She then produced the 2006 documentary Blindsight, which was directed by Lucy Walker and has received critical acclaim. As of February 3, 2013, it holds a 98% "Fresh" rating on Rotten Tomatoes, based on 49 reviews.

Personal life
Robson Orr has two brothers, Bruce and Joe. She also has an older half-brother, Ed Lee, from her mother's first marriage. She is a first cousin of Alice Walton, S. Robson Walton, and Jim Walton.

With Alice Walton and other Walton family members, she owns a stake in Robson Ranch Inc., an Oklahoma ranch encompassing  which produces wheat, soybeans, and corn. She is married to British financier Matthew Orr.

Filmography
Gordy (1995) – producer
Seven and a Match (2001) – executive producer
Blindsight (2006) – executive producer
First in Flight (2012) – executive producer
Rules Don't Apply (2016) - producer

References

External links

Living people
People from Rogers County, Oklahoma
People from Wagoner County, Oklahoma
Southern Methodist University alumni
Walton family
Film producers from Oklahoma
1957 births